Hadcock is an English surname, a variant of Adcock. Notable people with this surname include:

 Charles Hadcock (b. 1965), English sculptor
 Richard Neville Hadcock (1895–1980), English historian
 Tim Hadcock-Mackay (1963–2006), English hotelier

English-language surnames